Chris O'Sullivan (born May 15, 1974) is an American former professional ice hockey defenseman who played in the NHL with the Calgary Flames, Vancouver Canucks, and Mighty Ducks of Anaheim. He is currently a scout for the New York Islanders, serving in the role since 2006 after three seasons scouting with the Colorado Avalanche.

Playing career
As a youth, O'Sullivan played in the 1988 Quebec International Pee-Wee Hockey Tournament with The Boston Junior Bruins minor ice hockey team.

A top prospect out of high school, O'Sullivan was drafted by the Calgary Flames in the 2nd round, 30th overall in the 1992 NHL Entry Draft. After being drafted O'Sullivan chose to play in the college ranks and played with the Boston University Terriers for 4 years. O'Sullivan missed the majority of his freshman year (1992–1993) after suffering a neck injury during a game versus Boston College. O'Sullivan eventually recovered and became one of the top defensive players in the nation. His most successful season was during the 1994–1995 season when he led the Terriers in scoring with 56 points in 40 games and eventually leading the Terriers to a national championship in 1995, in which he was named the Most Outstanding Player.

After college O'Sullivan turned pro and split time with the Flames and their minor league affiliate Saint John Flames for the next 3 years. The 1996–1997 season would turn out to be O'Sullivan's longest stint in the NHL, playing in 27 games and scoring 10 points. Towards the end of the 1998–1999 season O'Sullivan was traded to the New York Rangers. He played 10 games with the Rangers minor league affiliate Hartford Wolf Pack before being released by the Rangers at the end of the season.

For the 1999–2000 season O'Sullivan was signed by the Vancouver Canucks. He played the majority of the season with the Syracuse Crunch while also playing 11 games with the Canucks. After the season, he was again released and picked up by the Mighty Ducks of Anaheim. He played the whole 2000–2001 season with the Cincinnati Mighty Ducks, scoring 49 points in 60 games. For the 2001–2002 season O'Sullivan played overseas in Switzerland with the Kloten Flyers.

After 1 season in Switzerland O'Sullivan returned to the Mighty Ducks for the 2002–2003 season. After only 2 games with the Mighty Ducks of Anaheim and 27 games with the Cincinnati Mighty Ducks O'Sullivan suffered another neck injury. O'Sullivan officially retired from hockey in September 2003.

Career statistics

Regular season and playoffs

International

Awards and honors

References

External links

1974 births
Living people
American men's ice hockey defensemen
Boston University Terriers men's ice hockey players
Calgary Flames draft picks
Calgary Flames players
Cincinnati Mighty Ducks players
Colorado Avalanche scouts
Hartford Wolf Pack players
Ice hockey people from Massachusetts
EHC Kloten players
Mighty Ducks of Anaheim players
New York Islanders scouts
Saint John Flames players
Sportspeople from Boston
Syracuse Crunch players
Vancouver Canucks players
NCAA men's ice hockey national champions
AHCA Division I men's ice hockey All-Americans
Ice hockey people from Boston